Frisilia sejuncta is a moth in the family Lecithoceridae. It was described by Edward Meyrick in 1929. It is found in southern India and Sri Lanka.

The wingspan is 12–13 mm. The forewings are light brownish, sprinkled with dark fuscous and the costa suffused with dark fuscous towards the base. The discal stigmata are blackish, the first moderate and dot like, the second forming a transverse-linear mark, in males these resting on more or less dark fuscous suffusion extending over the dorsal third of the wing, darkest and best defined anteriorly. There is some dark fuscous suffusion along the upper part of the termen. The hindwings light grey.

References

Moths described in 1929
Frisilia